Blackburn Aircraft Limited was a British aircraft manufacturer from 1914 to 1963 that concentrated mainly on naval and maritime aircraft.

History
Blackburn Aircraft was founded by Robert Blackburn and Jessy Blackburn, who built his first aircraft in Leeds in 1908 with the company's Olympia Works at Roundhay opening in 1914.

The Blackburn Aeroplane & Motor Company was created in 1914 and established in a new factory at Brough, East Riding of Yorkshire in 1916. Robert's brother Norman Blackburn later became managing director.

Blackburn acquired the Cirrus-Hermes Engineering company in 1934, beginning its manufacture of aircraft engines. However an updated range of engines was under development and Blackburn wanted to wait until it was established before giving its name to them, so Cirrus Hermes Engineering was retained as a separate company for the time being.

The company's name was changed to Blackburn Aircraft Limited in 1936.

In 1937, with the new Cirrus engines now well established, engine manufacturing was brought into the parent company as an operating division, giving rise to the Blackburn Cirrus name.

By 1937, pressure to re-arm was growing and the Yorkshire factory was approaching capacity. A fortuitous friendship between Maurice Denny, managing director of William Denny and Brothers, the Dumbarton ship building company, and Robert Blackburn resulted in the building of a new Blackburn factory at Barge Park, Dumbarton where production of the Blackburn Botha commenced in 1939.

Blackburn amalgamated with General Aircraft Limited in 1949 as Blackburn and General Aircraft Limited, reverting to Blackburn Aircraft Limited by 1958.

As part of the rationalisation of British aircraft manufacturers, its aircraft production and engine operations were absorbed into Hawker Siddeley and Bristol Siddeley respectively in 1960/1961. The Blackburn name was dropped completely in 1963.

An American company, Blackburn Aircraft Corp., was incorporated in Detroit on 20 May 1929 to acquire design and patent rights of the aircraft of Blackburn Airplane & Motor Co., Ltd. in the USA. It was owned 90% by Detroit Aircraft Corp. and 10% by Blackburn Airplane & Motor Co., Ltd. Agreements covered such rights in North and South America, excepting Brazil and certain rights in Canada and provided that all special tools and patterns were to be supplied by the UK company at cost.

Locations
The company had factories at Olympia in Leeds, Sherburn-in-Elmet, Brough (East Yorkshire) and Dumbarton. In the early days, Blackburn himself flew aircraft on the beaches at Marske and Filey, with the company also using the former RAF Holme-on-Spalding Moor. Before production shifted to Sherburn-in-Elmet and Brough from the Leeds site, aircraft were flown in and out of Olympia works by an adjacent airstrip in Roundhay Park.

Aircraft

Blackburn First Monoplane (1909) – Single-engine, single-seat high-wing monoplane aircraft
Blackburn Second Monoplane (1911) – Single-engine midwing monoplane aircraft.
Blackburn Mercury (1911) – Single-engine, two-seat midwing monoplane training aircraft
Blackburn Type B (1912) – Single-engine, two-seat midwing monoplane training aircraft. A development of the Blackburn Mercury
Blackburn Type D (1912) – Single-engine single-seat mid-winged monoplane. Preserved in flying condition by the Shuttleworth Collection at Old Warden, and survives as the oldest British-built aircraft.
Blackburn Type E (1912) – Single-engine, midwing metal-framed monoplanes, one single-seater one twin.
Blackburn Type I (1913) – Single-engine 1/2-seat mid-wing monoplane built both as land- and seaplane.
Blackburn Type L (1914) – Single-engine two-seat biplane seaplane.
AD Scout (1915) – Admiralty designed single-engine, single-seat pusher anti-Zeppelin aircraft. Two each built by Blackburn and by Hewlett & Blondeau.
Blackburn Twin Blackburn (1915) – Twin-fuselage, two-engine, two-seat anti-Zeppelin seaplane.
Blackburn General Purpose (1916) – Twin-engine three-seat seaplane biplane anti-submarine patrol bomber.
Blackburn Triplane (1916) – Blackburn-designed triplane version of Scout
Blackburn White Falcon (1916) – Single-engine two-seat mid-wing monoplane.
Blackburn R.T.1 Kangaroo (1918) – Twin-engine, three-seat biplane reconnaissance/torpedo bomber
Blackburn N.1B (1918) – Single-engine single-seat biplane flying boat escort bomber (started; not finished; never flew).
Blackburn Blackburd (1918) – Single-engine, single-seat biplane torpedo bomber
Blackburn Sidecar (1919) Single-engine two-seat mid wing monoplane ultra light: may not have flown.
Blackburn T.1 Swift (1920) – Single-engine, single-seat floatplane torpedo bomber
Blackburn T.2 Dart (1921) – Single-engine, single-seat biplane torpedo bomber
Alula D.H.6 (1921) – Experimental aircraft to test the Alula wing using an Airco DH.6 fuselage.
Alula Semiquaver (1921) – Single-engine Alula wing conversion of the Martinsyde Semiquaver.
Blackburn R.1 Blackburn (1922) – Single-engine, three-seat biplane naval spotter/reconnaissance aircraft.
Blackburn Pellet (1923) – Single-engine single-seat biplane Schneider racer.
Blackburn Bluebird (1924) – Single-engine, two-seat biplane training/touring aircraft
Blackburn T.4 Cubaroo (1924) – Single-engine, four-seat large biplane torpedo bomber.
Blackburn T.3 Velos (1925) – Single-engine, two-seat biplane bomber floatplane
Blackburn R.2 Airedale (1925) – Single-engine three-seat high-wing monoplane reconnaissance.
Blackburn T.5 Ripon (1926) – Single-engine, two-seat biplane reconnaissance/torpedo bomber
Blackburn Sprat (1926) single-engine two-seat biplane advanced trainer.
Blackburn R.B.1 Iris (1926) – Three-engine, five-seat biplane flying boat
Blackburn F.1 Turcock (1928) – Single-engine fighter aircraft.
Blackburn F.2 Lincock (1928) – Single-engine, single-seat biplane fighter.
Blackburn Beagle (1928) – Single-engine two-seat two-seat biplane bomber.
Blackburn Bluebird IV (1929) – Single-engine, two-seat biplane training/touring aircraft.
Blackburn 2F.1 Nautilus (1929) – Single-engine two-seat engine biplane fighter
Blackburn T.7B (1929) – Single-engine three-seat biplane bomber/reconnaissance prototype for Japanese Navy. Built as Mitsubishi B2M
Blackburn R.B.2 Sydney (1930) – Three-engine, four-seat parasol-wing long-range flying boat.
Blackburn C.B.2 Nile (1930) – Three-engine, two-seat parasol-wing cargo transport, a variant of the Sydney.
Blackburn B-1 Segrave (1930) – Twin-engine, four-seat low-wing monoplane touring aircraft
Blackburn C.A.15C (1932) – Twin-engine ten passenger high-wing monoplane/ biplane airliner.
Blackburn T.8 Baffin (1932) – Single-engine, two-seat biplane torpedo bomber.
Blackburn B-2 (1932) – Single-engine, two-seat biplane training aircraft.
Blackburn B-3 M.1/30 (1932) – Single-engine, two-seat biplane naval torpedo bomber.
Blackburn B-5 Baffin (1932)
Blackburn R.B.3 Perth (1933) – Three-engine, five-seat biplane flying boat.
Blackburn T.9 Shark (1933) – single-engine, three-seat carrier-based biplane torpedo bomber; see also the prototype named Blackburn B-6 Shark (1933)
Blackburn F.3 (1934) – Single-engine single-seat biplane fighter: built, never flew
Blackburn B-7 (1934) – General-purpose biplane.
Blackburn H.S.T.10 (B-9) (1936) – Twin-engine twelve-passenger low-wing monoplane airliner: built, never flew
Blackburn Skua (1937) – Company designation B-24. Single-engine, two-seat low-wing monoplane naval fighter/dive bomber
Blackburn Roc (1938) – Company designation B-25. Single-engine, two-seat low-wing monoplane naval fighter/dive bomber with rear turret (detail design and built by Boulton Paul Aircraft)
Blackburn Botha (1938) – B-36. Twin-engine, four-seat high-wing monoplane reconnaissance/torpedo bomber & crew trainer
 Blackburn B-29: Submission for a naval torpedo-bomber reconnaissance aircraft to Specification S.24/37 (which resulted in the Fairey Barracuda); mock-up only, never flew.
Blackburn B-20 (1940) – Twin-engine, six-seat experimental monoplane retractable-hull flying boat. Built for Air Ministry specification R1/36
Blackburn Firebrand (1942) – B-37. Single-engine, single-seat propeller naval fighter
Blackburn B-40 - development of B.20 design for specification R.13/40 . Cancelled. 
Blackburn B.44 (1942) – Single-engine flying-boat fighter
Blackburn Firebrand  (1942) – B.45. Single-engine, single-seat propeller naval strike fighter development of B-37.
Blackburn Firebrand  (1945) – B.46. Single-engine, single-seat propeller naval strike fighter development of B-45.
Blackburn Firecrest (Y.A.1, B-48) (1947) – Single-engine, single-seat propeller naval strike fighter.
Blackburn B-50 (1945) – Design proposal for a single engine Nene powered Fleet Air Arm strike fighter. Not built.
Blackburn B-52 – Design proposal for a single-engined advanced trainer to meet Specification T.7/45. Not built.
Blackburn B-67 (1947) – Design proposal for a naval fighter to specification N40/46. Not built.
Blackburn B-68 (1946) – Design proposal for a naval fighter. Not built.
Blackburn B-71 (1947) – Design proposal for a flexible deck landing version of B.67. Not built.
Blackburn B-74 (1947) – Design proposal for a naval fighter. Not built.
Blackburn B-54 (Y.A.5, Y.A.7, Y.A.8) (1949) – single-piston-engine, two-seat contra-rotating propeller naval anti-submarine aircraft.
Blackburn B-82 (1949) – Design proposal for a naval fighter to specification N.14/49.
Blackburn B-88 (Y.B.1) (1950) – single-turboprop-engine, two-seat contra-rotating propeller naval anti-submarine aircraft
Blackburn B-89 (1951) – Submission for a naval fighter to specification N.114T.
Blackburn B-90 (1951) – Design proposal for an experimental swing wing aircraft to ER.110T. Not built. 
Blackburn B-94 (1951) – Design proposal for a flexible deck landing version of B.90. Not built.
Handley Page HP.88 (Blackburn Y.B.2) (1951) – Experimental aircraft for Handley Page using a Supermarine-built fuselage.
Blackburn B-95 (1952) – Design proposal for a revised version of B.89. 
Blackburn B-97 (1952) – Design proposal for a rocket powered fighter to specification F.124T. Not built.
Blackburn B-99 (1952) – Development of N.97. Not built.
Blackburn Beverley (1950) – B-101. four-engine, high-wing, propellers, transport airplane (designed by General Aircraft)
Blackburn B-102 (1952) – Design proposal for a mixed powerplant fighter based on B.89 and B.95. Not built.  
Blackburn Buccaneer (Y.B.3, B-103) (1958) – twin-engine, two-seat jet naval strike aircraft to Naval Staff Requirement NA.39
Blackburn B-104 (1953) - Design proposal for a two-engine medium-range military transport for the Royal Air Force. Not built.
Blackburn B-109 (1958) – Design proposal for a Mach 1.5 strike fighter version of the Buccaneer for the Canadian Air Force. Not built.
Blackburn B-112 (1958) – Design proposal for a Mach 1.5 fighter version of the Buccaneer for the Royal Navy. Not built.
Blackburn B-117 (1960) – Design proposal for a high attitude fighter version of the Buccaneer. Not built.
Blackburn B-120 (1962) – Design proposal for a Mach 1.8 fighter version of the Buccaneer. Not built.

The company also produced aircraft from other aircraft companies' specifications, such as the Sopwith Cuckoo (1918) and the Fairey Swordfish (1942), both of which were built at Blackburn's Sherburn-in-Elmet factory.

Piston engines
Blackburn Cirrus Major (1936)
Blackburn Cirrus Minor (1937)
Blackburn Cirrus Midget (1937)
Blackburn Cirrus Bombardier (c. 1954)

Gas turbine engines (with Turbomeca)
Blackburn-Turbomeca Artouste (1947)
Blackburn-Turbomeca Palas (1950)
Blackburn-Turbomeca Palouste (1952)
Blackburn-Turbomeca A.129 (later known as the Bristol Siddeley Nimbus, then Rolls-Royce Nimbus) (1958)

See also

Notes

References

External links

The history of Blackburn Aircraft Ltd.

British companies established in 1914
1960 disestablishments in England
Companies based in the East Riding of Yorkshire
Former defence companies of the United Kingdom
Defunct aircraft engine manufacturers of the United Kingdom
Defunct aircraft manufacturers of England
Hawker Siddeley
History of the East Riding of Yorkshire
Vehicle manufacturing companies established in 1914
Vehicle manufacturing companies disestablished in 1960
1914 establishments in England